The 1987 season of the Paraguayan Primera División, the top category of Paraguayan football, was played by 10 teams. The national champions were Cerro Porteño.

Results

First stage

Second stage

Third stage

External links
Paraguay 1987 season at RSSSF

Para
Paraguayan Primera División seasons
1